Dena Dubal is the David A. Coulter Endowed Chair in Ageing and Neurodegenerative Disease at University of California, San Francisco. Dubal has demonstrated that the hormone Klotho can enhance cognition and protect the brain from neurodegenerative decline.

Early life and education 
Dubal is from Houston. She attended Episcopal High School and graduated in 1992. She was an undergraduate student at the University of California, Berkeley, where she studied neuroscience with a minor in anthropology. During her undergraduate physiology classes she recognised that the process of ageing still presented many mysteries to the scientific community. After earning her bachelor's degree, Dubal studied medicine at the University of Kentucky College of Medicine. She worked with Phyllis Wise on the impact of hormones on brain injury caused by stroke. She was a neurological resident at the University of California, San Francisco, where she was elected Chief Resident and continued to research ageing.

Research and career 
Dubal studies the molecular mechanisms of resilience and how these are impacted by neurodegenerative diseases. She holds the David A. Coulter Endowed Chair in Ageing and Neurodegenerative Disease at University of California, San Francisco, and practises as a neurologist in San Francisco. In 2011 she started working on the Klotho hormone. At the time it was known that mice who were bred to make extra Klotho had lives that were 30% longer than those without it. Dubal demonstrated that mice with Alzheimer's disease with extra Klotho were protected from dementia. She went on to show that the brains of healthy mice with extra Klotho were not only protected from neurodegeneration, but their cognitive abilities were enhanced. It has since been shown that Klotho can act to protect against Parkinson's and multiple sclerosis. The mechanisms that underpin Klotho's enhancement of cognitive ability are still unknown.

Alongside working on mouse models, in 2019 Dubal was the first to show that Klotho may protect people from Alzheimer's disease. She demonstrated this by monitoring for the well-known Alzheimer's disease risk factors Apolipoprotein E (APOE) e4. Dubal revealed that patients with the genetic variant APOE e4 have biomarkers of Alzheimer's disease, even before experiencing symptoms, whilst patients with APOE e4 and Klotho do not have these biomarkers.

Dubal has identified a biological mechanism – an epigenetic change on the X chromosome – that may give rise to why women live longer. She has shown that female mice with a particular pattern of sex hormones during their ovarian cycle are more likely to suffer from cognitive decline.

Awards and honours 
 2009 American Federation for Aging Research Paul Beeson Career Development Award
 2015 American Neurological Association Grass Neuroscience Award

Selected publications 
 </ref>
 </ref>
 </ref>

References 

Living people
Year of birth missing (living people)
American neuroscientists
American women neuroscientists
University of California, San Francisco faculty
University of California, Berkeley alumni
University of Kentucky alumni
21st-century American women